The Montreal Public Libraries Network (previously Réseau des bibliothèques publiques de Montréal) is the public library system on the Island of Montreal in Quebec, Canada.  It is the largest French language public library system in North America, and also has items in English and other languages.  Its central branch closed in March 2005 and its collections incorporated into the collections of the Grande Bibliothèque.

The municipally-run Montreal Public Libraries Network (as distinct from the provincial Bibliothèque et Archives nationales du Québec, which is also located in Montreal) includes 67 libraries, including 44 libraries in the city of Montreal and 12 branches in other municipalities on the Island of Montreal. There are several additional branches which are privately funded public libraries within the system and which require a nominal membership fee.

History

Montreal Mechanics Institute was one of a series of Mechanic's Institutes that were set up around the world after becoming popular in Britain. It housed a subscription library that allowed members who paid a fee to borrow books. The Mechanic's Institutes libraries eventually became public libraries when the establishment of free libraries occurred.

Services
Information and reference services
Access to full text databases
Community information
Internet access
Reader's advisory services
Programs for children, youth and adults
Delivery to homebound individuals
Interlibrary loan
Free downloadable audiobooks

Branches

Ahuntsic
Belleville
Benny
Bibliobus
Biblio-courrier
Bibliothèque de la Maison culturelle et communautaire
Bibliothèque interculturelle
Cartierville
Charleroi
Côte-des-Neiges
Du Boisé
Frontenac
Georges-Vanier
Haut-Anjou
Henri-Bourassa
Hochelaga
Île des Sœurs
Jean-Corbeil
Langelier
La Petite-Patrie
Le Prévost
L'Île-Bizard
L’Octogone (LaSalle)
Maisonneuve
Marc-Favreau
Marie-Uguay
Mercier
Mordecai-Richler
Notre-Dame-de-Grâce
Parc-Extension
Père-Ambroise
Pierrefonds
Plateau-Mont-Royal
Pointe-aux-Trembles
Rivière-des-Prairies
Robert-Bourassa
Rosemont
Roxboro
Saint-Charles
Saint-Henri
Saint-Léonard
Saint-Michel
Saint-Pierre
Salaberry
Saul-Bellow
Jacqueline-De Repentigny
Vieux-Saint-Laurent

Gallery

See also
 Atwater Library of the Mechanics' Institute of Montreall

References

External links

Montréal Libraries 
Bibliothèques Montréal  
2006 data from Canadian Urban Libraries Council
 Collection de la ville de Montréal (R9582) at Library and Archives Canada. The collection holds some 8500 photographs of places and events in Montreal and winter sceneries in Peribonca.

Public libraries in Quebec
Libraries in Montreal